The High Commissioner of Australia to Malta is an officer of the Australian Department of Foreign Affairs and Trade and the head of the High Commission of the Commonwealth of Australia in Malta. The position has the rank and status of an Ambassador Extraordinary and Plenipotentiary and is currently held by Jennifer Cartmill since 22 July 2020. The high commissioner also holds non-resident accreditation as ambassador to Tunisia (since 2012). There has been a resident Australian High Commissioner in Malta since 1967.

Posting history
Australia first established an official presence in Malta with the establishment of a Migration Office on 4 September 1961, with the primary responsibility of managing the migration of Maltese to Australia, based in the Palazzo Spinola in Valletta until 1963, and then in Airways House in Sliema from 1963. Australia recognised the State of Malta on its independence on 21 September 1964, with a former Commonwealth minister, Alick Downer, and the ambassador of Australia to the Netherlands, Walter Crocker, representing Australia during the independence celebrations on 19–23 September.

On 12 October 1966, the government of Harold Holt approved the establishment of a resident High Commission in Malta, and on 6 November 1966 during an official visit to Melbourne by the Prime Minister of Malta, Borg Olivier, prime ministers Holt and Olivier issued a joint communique indicating that the appointment of a high commissioner was imminent. An officer with the Department of External Affairs, Douglas Sturkey, took up office as acting high commissioner in Malta on 30 March 1967. The first high commissioner, former immigration minister Sir Hubert Opperman, took up office in July 1967 and presented his letters of commission on 24 July 1967.

Tunisia
The first resident Australian Ambassador to Algeria since 5 April 1976, John Anthony Piper, was accredited to Tunisia as non-resident Ambassador on 22 October 1976, and presented his credentials to the President of Tunisia, Habib Bourguiba, on 23 June 1977. Responsibility for Tunisia was transferred from the Algiers embassy to the Australian Embassy in Amman, Jordan, on 3 January 1989. From 3 January 1989 to 14 April 1999, the Australian Ambassador to Jordan was accredited to Tunisia.

From 14 April 1999 until December 2012, non-resident accreditation for Tunisia was held by the Ambassador of Australia to Egypt in Cairo. The Australian High Commission in Malta has been accredited to Tunisia since the appointment of Jane Lambert in December 2012 as the non-resident ambassador.

High Commissioners

Notes
 Also non-resident Ambassador to the Holy See, 1976–1978.
 Acting High Commissioner until 14 July 1982.
 Also non-resident Ambassador to Tunisia, 2012–present.

See also
Australia–Malta relations

References

External links

Australian High Commission, Malta

 
 
Australia and the Commonwealth of Nations
Malta and the Commonwealth of Nations
Malta
Australia